Jacqueline Hurst is a British life coach, author and columnist for GQ Magazine. She is often quoted in the mainstream media for opinions in The Sunday Times, The Telegraph, Harper's Bazaar and The Times, etc. Jacqueline is a member of the Royal Society of Medicine and the National Guild of Hypnotists.

Jacqueline has been working as a life coach with her private practice based in London's Mayfair. Her practice areas are relationships, anxiety, low confidence/self-esteem, life changes, stress management, and burnout, and advocates the works of Byron Katie, Eckhart Tolle, Marianne Williamson and Dr Wayne Dyer. In 2021, Gregg Wallace credits her with helping relieve anxiety before his stint on BBC Strictly Come Dancing.

Bibliography

References

Living people
British writers
Life coaches
British women columnists
21st-century British women writers
British magazine writers
21st-century English women writers
GQ (magazine)
Writers from London
Year of birth missing (living people)